The Hillehorn (also spelled Hillenhorn) is a mountain of the Lepontine Alps, located between the Gantertal and the Binntal in the canton of Valais, close to the border with Italy. The main summit has an elevation of 3,181 meters, while the Italian border culminates on the secondary summit named Punta Mottiscia at 3,158 meters. Between the two peaks is the Hillejoch.

References

External links
Hillehorn on Hikr
Punta Mottiscia on Hikr

Mountains of the Alps
Alpine three-thousanders
Mountains of Valais
Mountains partially in Italy
Italy–Switzerland border
Lepontine Alps
Mountains of Switzerland